A Memorial to Queen Victoria stands in Woodhouse Moor, Leeds, West Yorkshire, England.

The memorial consists of figures and a frieze in bronze on a plinth and pedestal of Portland stone.  The sculptor was George Frampton, and the architect working with him was Leonard Stokes.  The figure on the top of the pedestal is that of Queen Victoria sitting on a throne, with a sceptre resting on her right forearm, and holding an orb in her left hand.  The back of the throne has the appearance of a radiant Sun.  On the sides of the pedestal are figures in niches, that on the left representing Peace, and that on the right representing Industry.  On the front of the plinth are carved the Royal Arms, and on the back is the coat of arms of Leeds and an inscription.  Beneath the pedestal is a plinth with a continuous frieze incorporating the words "INDIA", "AUSTRALIA", "CANADA", and "AFRICA" on scrolled plaques that are flanked by owls and foliage.  The plinth stands on four steps.

The memorial was unveiled on 27 November 1905, and originally stood outside Leeds Town Hall.  It was moved to Woodhouse Moor in 1937.  The memorial was designated as a Grade II* listed building on 5 August 1976.

During the wave of George Floyd protests in the United Kingdom, it was reported on 9 June 2020 that the statue had been vandalized by painting with slogans such as 'racist', 'colonizer', 'justice', "BLM" (Black Lives Matter) and 'slave owner' (although slave ownership in the British Empire had been abolished in 1833, four years before she ascended the throne).

See also
Grade II* listed buildings in Leeds
Listed buildings in Leeds (Hyde Park and Woodhouse)

Notes and references

Notes

Citations

Sources

 

Buildings and structures completed in 1905
Memorial to Queen Victoria
Grade II* listed buildings in West Yorkshire
Victoria, Leeds
Sculptures by George Frampton
Statues in England
Leeds
Grade II* listed monuments and memorials
1905 establishments in England
Sun in art
Vandalized works of art in the United Kingdom
Sculptures of birds
Sculptures of lions
Relocated buildings and structures in the United Kingdom